Ofili is a surname. Notable people with the surname include:

Chris Ofili (born 1968), British artist
Cindy Ofili (born 1994), American-born British track and field athlete
Edward Ofili (born 1957), Nigerian sprinter
Elizabeth Ofili (born 1956), Nigerian cardiologist
Tiffany Ofili (born 1987), American-born British track and field athlete